Darren O'Neill is an Irish amateur boxer. He won a gold medal at the 2009 EU Championships, and silver at the 2010 European Championships and 2014 EU Championships. He also captained Ireland's boxers at the 2012 Summer Olympics in London.

Boxing
O'Neill claimed all honours around him in Ireland at underage levels, as well as playing for Kilkenny U-21 hurley team. He finished second at light-heavyweight at the National Championships 2005 and 2006 behind Kenneth Egan. O'Neill has since won four national middleweight championships and two heavyweight championships where he has excelled. He lost to Darren Sutherland on a close decision in 2008. He also lost out on a chance to compete at an Olympic qualifier to Sutherland in an IABA box-off.  O'Neill was also 2009 European Union champion and 2010 European silver medalist. In the 2010 European championships he defeated four opponents including medal favourite Sergey Derevyanchenko of Ukraine before losing to Artem Chebotarev of Russia in the final. He was named the captain of the Irish boxing team at the 2011 European Championships. He secured automatic Olympic qualification for the 2012 London games in the World Amateur Championships 2011. At the 2012 Summer Olympics in London he again captained the Irish boxing team, but went out in the last 16 to Stefan Härtel. He bore the flag for Ireland at the 2012 Summer Olympics closing ceremony.  By 2015, he had moved up to heavyweight, reaching the Irish final.

In July 2019 he announced his decision to turn professional.

See also 
RTE's collection of O'Neill articles - https://www.rte.ie/sport/search/?q=darren%20o'neill

References

Year of birth missing (living people)
Living people
Boxers at the 2012 Summer Olympics
Irish schoolteachers
Olympic boxers of Ireland
Irish male boxers
Boxers at the 2015 European Games
European Games competitors for Ireland
Middleweight boxers